Eupyridae or Eupyridai was a deme of ancient Attica.

The site of Eupyridae is tentatively located near modern Kamatero.

References

Populated places in ancient Attica
Former populated places in Greece
Demoi